Pehchaan is a drama series airs on DD National channel on every Monday - Friday at 2:30pm IST. The series is produced Baanyan Tree Media & Entertainment' and have received good Television Point Ratings after few weeks of its launch.

Cast
 Richa Soni as Tanvi
 Amit Pachori
 Daisy Irani
 Zarina Wahab
 Deepak Parashar
 Kulbir Kaur
 Suchitra Bandekar
 Neha Bam
 Priya Shinde as Simran
 Rinku Karmarkar as Kajri Mausi
 Aashish Kaul as Sameer
 Shweta Gautam as Shyama 
 Ashok Pandey
 Amrita Sant
 Suruchi Adarkar as Vidya
 Kanchan Gupta
 Mukesh Dhasmana
 Aijaz Ashfaq
 Shahab Khan 
 Rajeev Bhardwaj as Subash
 Megha Dhade
 Kruttika Sharma as Sweety

References

DD National original programming
Indian drama television series
Indian television series